Glasgow Hutchesons Aloysians Rugby Football Club, often abbreviated to GHA and colloquially referred to as G-HA!! , is a rugby union club based in the Giffnock area of East Renfrewshire, Scotland. The club plays its home matches at Braidholm and currently competes in the Scottish national 1, the second tier of Scottish club rugby.

History
The club was established by the 2002 merger between Glasgow Southern RFC and Hutchesons' - Aloysians' RFC. The former club was originally known as Clarkston but was renamed in 1995 with the ambition of creating the premier side on the south side of Glasgow.  The latter club was also formed as the result of an earlier merger between the former pupils (FPs) clubs of Hutchesons' Grammar School and St Aloysius' College. The merged club is now firmly established as the premier club on the south side of Glasgow.

Hutchesons' GSFP

The club was formed in 1923 playing out of Auldhouse, the school's sports ground in Eastwood (near Thornliebank). Admitted as a full member of the Scottish Rugby Union in 1937, the Hutchesons’ Club entered the National League system in Season 1973 at 2nd Division level, having dispensed with tradition to some degree by opting for "Open" status two years previously, a significant decision forced, by necessity, on many Scottish F.P. Clubs at that time.

1990 was to see further constitutional change when the club agreed amalgamation with close friends and one time rivals to form Hutchesons' Aloysians R.F.C.

Old Aloysians RFC

By contrast, the Old Aloysians club was formed in 1955 for the sole purpose of undertaking a challenge match against the extremely successful Saint Aloysius' College 1st XV. The unexpected success of this venture resulted in a decision to seek regular fixtures which led to a continuing upsurge in interest and the inevitable and rapid expansion of the F.P. Club. The first fixture was against Hutchesons' Grammar FP RFC., coincident with the invitation from Hutchesons' Grammar School to Saint Aloysius' College 1st XV to undertake regular fixtures. This long standing friendship led to the amalgamation in season 1990–91.

Hutchesons Aloysians

Richard Allan was selected as the club's first full internationalist for the Irish fixture at Murrayfield in 1969, to be followed by other distinguished players who gained representative honours. Brothers Gordon and Alan Bulloch were to gain national caps, with the former captaining the national side on several occasions. Ray Nelson was to achieve caps for the United States national team the U.S. Eagles.

Clarkston RFC

Unlike the two Former Pupil Clubs now involved at Braidholm, Clarkston RFC, since its formation in 1937, had always been an "Open" club, created by a variety of former pupil rugby players who did not wish to undertake cross city travel to indulge in their sport. Significantly the first club chairman was a Glasgow Academical, the first President a Glasgow High former pupil and the longest serving club captain and coach, Andrew Williams a product of Allan Glen's.

Playing initially at the local authority's Overlee ground, years of tireless fund raising saw the club's new facility at Braidholm opened by S.R.U. President Charlie Drummond in January 1971. The club entered the new National League structure in 1973 at 4th Division level, rising through the years to division two. With three pitches, floodlights, 250 seater stand and expanded clubhouse, in recognition of its changing character and by a significant membership majority at the May 1995 A.G.M., the club altered its name to Glasgow Southern RFC.

Glasgow Southern RFC

Over several years a variety of players graduated through the Club participation from both youth and senior level to achieve representative status. Full International caps were awarded to Gordon McIlwham, and Euan Murray while others have achieved selection at Youth level.

Further development
Agreement reached with a development organisation saw the original 1970 clubhouse demolished to make way for a health club. A new, state of the art, clubhouse was formally opened by S.R.U. President Ronnie Young at Braidholm in January 2002. The Glasgow Southern name was only to survive for seven years before it became evident to all concerned that the sport on the south side of Glasgow would be best served through amalgamation, an initiative formalised in May 2002 with the formation of Glasgow Hutchesons' Aloysians Rugby Football Club. Plans for an all-weather artificial pitch at Braidholm were announced in 2018.

Senior rugby

GHA run 4 senior sides, catering for all abilities and attitudes - The club's 1st XV and 2nd XV teams play at a highly-competitive national level, with the 3rd XV (known as the GHA Lions) competing within the regional reserve leagues. Additionally there is a long established veterans team (known as The Internationally Famous GHA Gazelles, captained by John Willock) who participate in a variety of social, friendly and touring matches.

Playing Overview
Following the amalgamation, GHA took the place of the newly promoted Hutchesons Aloysians in Premiership Division Two, with the new club achieving promotion to Premiership Division One at the first attempt. The club has since spent four seasons in the top division - 2003/04, 2004/05, 2007/08 and 2019/20. Following three seasons in Premiership Two which saw a wealth of the club's most experienced players depart, ended in relegation to Premiership Three for season 2011/12.

In Premiership Three, with the arrival of a new coaching team and experienced ex-professionals Andrew Henderson and Hefin O'Hare GHA managed to finish second but due to league restructuring were denied promotion. Within the newly regionalised third tier of 2012/13 the club achieved promotion by winning RBS Championship A thanks to a historic 23–0 final day, winner-takes-all match away to local rivals Cartha Queens Park.

Following a difficult first season back in the second tier the club once again had a complete change of coaching team, which almost saw a surprise return to the Premiership during season 2014/15, only to be denied 39–22 in a relegation / promotion play-off with Stirling County. In yet another severe reversal of fortunes, the club suffered a season of disappointment in 2015/16, flirted with relegation until safety was assured on the penultimate weekend of the season.

After two consecutive third-place finishes in National League One; GHA were elevated to the Premiership for season 2019/20 due to the restructuring of Scottish club rugby. With the creation of the SRU's new semi-professional Super 6 competition, six of the existing Premiership teams would be demoted to National League One with the top six teams in that league taking their place. The club had mixed success in a very competitive league; with very little separating play-off and relegation places, notable achievements did include first ever away victories at Edinburgh Accies and league leaders Marr. GHA secured their Premiership status with a losing bonus point in their final game against Selkirk. However, three weeks later the 2019/20 season was declared null and void by the SRU due to the coronavirus pandemic, with no promotion or relegation between leagues.

 League cancelled with 4 matches remaining, potential finishing position was 7th - 9th.

Competitive playing record (2002–present)
Record correct as of 30/04/2022

Current 1st XV Squad

 (C)

Centurions Club
The following players have represented GHA's 1st XV on more than 100 occasions. Appearances for the original constituent clubs are also included on this list.

These totals are accurate to 30/04/2022.

*Appearances include games played for Glasgow Southern/Clarkston
†Appearances include games played for Hutchesons' Aloysians
BoldActive Players

Records & Statistics

Individual Records

Appearances
Correct as of 24/10/2021, Current players in bold.

All-Time Most Appearances (Including Constituent Clubs)

All-Time Most Appearances (GHA Only)

Points Scorers
Correct as of 24/10/2021, Current players in bold.

Top Points Scorers

 Most points: 1142 – James Noonan (2002-2010)
 Most league points: ? –
 Most cup points: 113 – James Noonan (2002-2010)
 Most points in a game by a player: ?-? (v ?, in ?, 00 January 0000
 Most points scored in a single season: 208 – James Noonan in 2002–2003 & 2009-2010
 Most points scored in a calendar year: ? – ? in 0000
 Most points scored on debut: ?-? (v ?, in ?, 00 January 0000

Top Try Scorers

 Most tries: 69 – Rory Watson (2002-2009) 
 Most league tries: ? – 
 Most cup tries: 12 – Rangi Jericevich (2003-2016) & Rory Watson (2002-2008) 
 Most tries in a game by a player: 4 – Alan Auld (v Peebles (H), 2015-2016 National League One, 3/10/2015) & Niall Cassie (v Peebles (H), 2010-2011 Premiership Two, 23/10/2010)
 Most tries scored in a single season: 20 – Rangi Jericevich (2012-2013 season) 
 Most tries scored in a calendar year: ? –  in 0000
 Most tries scored on debut: ? –  (versus, on 00 January 0000)

Team Records
Matches
 First Competitive match: GHA RFC 23-20 Ayr RFC (in Premiership Two, 31 August 2002)
 First Scottish Premiership match: Stirling County RFC 39-24 GHA RFC (30 August 2003)
 First Scottish Cup match: GHA RFC 22-9 Livingston RFC (3rd Round (Last 64), 2 November 2002}
 First Billy Barnes Cup match: Cartha Queens Park RFC 27-34 GHA RFC (2 September 2017)

Record Wins
All stats correct up to 24/10/2021
 Biggest Win: GHA RFC 87-0 Perthshire RFC (Scottish Cup 1st Round (Last 64), 30 August 2014)
 Biggest League Win: GHA RFC 87-3 Kirkcaldy RFC (National League One, 29 September 2018)
 Biggest Cup Win: GHA RFC 87-0 Perthshire RFC (Scottish Cup 1st Round (Last 64), 30 August 2014)
 Biggest Home Win: GHA RFC 87-0 Perthshire RFC (Scottish Cup 1st Round (Last 64), 30 August 2014)
 Biggest Away Win: Stewart's Melville RFC 5-66 GHA RFC (National League One, 1 October 2016)

Record defeats
All stats correct up to 24/10/2021
 Biggest Defeat: Boroughmuir RFC 76-5 GHA RFC (National League, 23 March 2014)
 Biggest League Defeat: Boroughmuir RFC 76-5 GHA RFC (National League, 23 March 2014)
 Biggest Cup Defeat: Glasgow Hawks '64-5 GHA RFC (Scottish Cup 3rd Round (Last 16), 27 February 2016)
 Biggest Home Defeat: GHA RFC 0-44 Stewart's Melville RFC (National League, 24 August 2013)
 Biggest Away Defeat: Boroughmuir RFC 76-5 GHA RFC (National League, 23 March 2014)

Other match records
All stats correct up to 24/10/2021
 Highest Scoring Draw: Haddington RFC 29-29 GHA RFC (Premiership Two, 26 September 2009)
 Lowest Scoring Draw: GHA RFC 6-6 Selkirk RFC (Premiership Two, 19 October 2002) & Ayr RFC 6-6 GHA RFC (Premiership One, 15 December 2007)
 Highest Scoring Home Draw: GHA RFC 17-17 Cartha Queens Park RFC (Premiership Two, 16 September 2006)
 Lowest Scoring Home Draw: GHA RFC 6-6 Selkirk RFC (Premiership Two, 19 October 2002)
 Highest Scoring Away Draw: Haddington RFC 29-29 GHA RFC (Premiership Two, 26 September 2009)
 Lowest Scoring Away Draw: Ayr RFC 6-6 GHA RFC (Premiership One, 15 December 2007)

High scores and bonus points
All stats correct up to 24/10/2021
 Most points scored
 In a Win: 87 (GHA RFC 87-0 Perthshire RFC (Scottish Cup 1st Round (Last 64), 30 August 2014) & (GHA RFC 87-3 Kirkcaldy RFC (National League One), 29 September 2018)
 In a Defeat: 47 (Aberdeen Grammar 57-47 GHA RFC, 12 October 2019)
 Most points conceded 
 In a Win: 47 (Hamilton RFC 47-50 GHA RFC, 10 November 2018)
 In a Defeat: 76 (Boroughmuir RFC 76-5 GHA RFC, 22 March 2014)
 Highest Combined Points: 104 (Aberdeen Grammar 57-47 GHA RFC, 12 October 2019)
 Most tries scored: ? (v ?, 00 January 0000
 Most tries conceded: ? (v ?, 00 January 0000

Sequences
All stats correct up to 24/10/2021
Longest unbeaten run
 Overall: ? (00 January 0000 to 00 December 0000)
 Home: ? (00 January 0000 to 00 December 0000)
 Away: ? (00 January 0000 to 00 December 0000)
Longest losing run 
 Overall: 9 (23 August 2003 to 29 October 2010)
 Home: ? (00 January 0000 to 00 December 0000)
 Away: ? (00 January 0000 to 00 December 0000)
Longest winless run
 Overall: ? (00 January 0000 to 00 December 0000)
 Home: ? (00 January 0000 to 00 December 0000)
 Away: ? (00 January 0000 to 00 December 0000)

Individual Seasons
All stats correct up to 24/10/2021
 Most games played in a season: 26 (2005-2006 & 2014–2015 season)
 Most wins in a season: ? (in ? games, 0000–0000 season)
 Most League wins in a Season: 17 (in 22 games, 2014–2015 season), 14 (in 18 games, 2012–2013 season)
 Fewest wins in a season: ? (in ? games, 0000–0000 season)
 Fewest league wins in a season: ? (in ? games, 0000–0000 season)
 Most defeats in a season: ? (in ? games, 0000–0000 season)
 Most league defeats in a season: ? (in ? games, 0000–0000 season)

Opponents and Familiarity
All stats correct up to 24/10/2021
 Club played most often: ? v  (won ?, drawn ?, lost ?)
 Club played most often in league matches: ? v 
 Club played most often in cup matches: 3 v Hillhead / Jordanhill RFC
 Non-home ground GHA have played on most often: ? at 
 Player who has played the most games against one opponent for GHA: ? by ? against ?
 Player who has played the most games against GHA: ? by ? for ?

Junior Rugby

GHA has a large junior rugby section consisting of over 400 boys and girls ranging from micros up to Under 18s. The junior section has contributed several players to the senior set up including James Eddie who subsequently signed for Glasgow's professional team, the Glasgow Warriors.

GHA's ongoing ties with Hutchesons' Grammar School and St. Aloysius' College can also be seen from the large number of pupils and former pupils of both schools playing at the club. Links have also been forged with local state schools, particularly Williamwood High School and Mearns Castle High School whose pupils and former pupils are also widely represented throughout the club.

The GHA Rugby Academy
The GHA Rugby Academy was established in 2012 and is aimed at helping talented young players at the club to realise their potential and achieve their rugby ambitions.

The GHA Rugby Academy offers the club's most talented young players an opportunity to experience a professional approach to training and playing rugby. It was set up to produce future 1st XV players for GHA RFC, provide more players for the Glasgow district set up and ultimately get more players into National Age Grade Squads. It was seen as a necessary development and use of the clubs limited resources in order to develop the long term sustainability of the club and support its long-term ambitions.

Notable players
This is a list of current and former GHA players who have gained full-time professional contracts within a full-time professional rugby squad and/or achieved senior International, International A or International 7s Honours.

This list does not include players who were allocated to play for GHA in the Scottish Rugby draft whereby players from Scotland's full-time professional squads - Glasgow Warriors and Edinburgh Rugby - are annually drafted by Scottish Premiership clubs to play for them on weekends when not selected for the professional teams. During GHA's spell in the Premiership, current Scotland Internationals Johnnie Beattie and John Barclay were among those to be allocated to play for them.

Post the 2002 amalgamation
  Ben Addison - Scotland 7s
  James Malcolm - Glasgow Warriors, London Scottish
  Rory Hughes - Glasgow Warriors, Scotland 7s, Scotland
  Jon Welsh - Glasgow Warriors, Newcastle Falcons, Scotland
  Zach Mercer - Bath Rugby, England
  Peter Jericevich - Scotland 7s
  Alan Bulloch - Glasgow Warriors, Scotland
  Carlo di Ciacca - Glasgow Caledonians (who later became Glasgow Warriors), Edinburgh Rugby
  James Eddie - Glasgow Warriors, Scotland A, Scotland 7s 
  Calum Forrester - Glasgow Warriors,  Scotland A, Scotland 7s
  Andrew Henderson - Glasgow Warriors, Scotland
  Andrew Kelly - Glasgow Warriors
  Gareth McClure - Glasgow Warriors, Newcastle Falcons
  Joe Naufahu - Glasgow Warriors, Southland, Canterbury
  Hefin O'Hare - Glasgow Warriors, Scotland 7s
  Jamie Pinder - Northland, North Harbour
  Sam Pinder - Glasgow Warriors, Northland, Scotland
  Andrew Plastow - Queensland Reds, Australia 7s
  Andy Rennick - Border Reivers, Northampton Saints
  Gavin Walsh - Northampton Saints, Ireland A
  Ross West - Queensland Reds
  Scott Cowan - Southland, Otago Highlanders
  Graham Harkness - Singapore
  John Fitzpatrick - Scotland 7s
  Ross Armour - Hong Kong 7s
  Erik Cavan - Norway
  Milan Marinković - Serbia
  Will Alton - Hungary

Pre the 2002 amalgamation
  Euan Murray - Scotland, British and Irish Lions
  Richard Allan - Scotland
  Ray Nelson - USA
  Gordon Bulloch - Scotland, British and Irish Lions
  Gordon McIlwham - Scotland
  Anthony Posa - Croatia

Scotland Club Internationalists
 Andrew Kelly - 2007 
 Jon Welsh - 2008
 Grant Mollison - 2020

Scotland U20/U21 Age Grade Internationalists
The following players gained either Under 20 or Under 21 Age Grade International honours whilst playing senior rugby at GHA.

Under 21 (Age group was disbanded after 2006 season)
Euan Murray - 1999, 2000, 2001
 Justin Reid - 2003
 Alasdhair McFarlane - 2005
 John W. Beattie - 2005
 James Eddie - 2005
 Iain Kennedy - 2005, 2006
 Calum Forrester - 2006

Under 20 (Age group replaced Under 21s from 2007 onwards)
 Peter Jericevich - 2008
 James Malcolm - 2013
 Adam Scott - 2021
 Gregor Hiddlestone - 2022
 Andrew Stirrat - 2022
 Jonny Morris - 2023
 Amena Caqusau - 2023

Club Presidents

Club captains

Head coaches

Braidholm Sevens

The club runs the Braidholm Sevens tournament.

Honours

Men

 Langholm Sevens
 Champions (1): 2003
 Glasgow City Sevens
 Champions (1): 2012
 Howe of Fife Sevens
 Champions (1): 2022
 Cambuslang Sevens
 Champions (1): 2003
 Hamilton Sevens
 Champions (1): 2016

Women

 Mull Sevens
 Champions (1): 2006

References

External links
 
 Glasgow Warriors
 Scottish Rugby Union

Scottish rugby union teams
Rugby union in East Renfrewshire
2002 establishments in Scotland
Rugby clubs established in 2002
Giffnock